Janusz Szczerkowski (born 9 May 1954) is a Polish athlete. He competed in the men's decathlon at the 1980 Summer Olympics.

References

1954 births
Living people
Athletes (track and field) at the 1980 Summer Olympics
Polish decathletes
Olympic athletes of Poland
Sportspeople from Bydgoszcz